The men's super heavyweight (+91 kg/200.2 lbs) Full-Contact category at the W.A.K.O. World Championships 2007 in Coimbra was the heaviest of the male Full-Contact tournaments involving twelve fighters from three continents (Europe, Africa and North America).  Each of the matches was three rounds of two minutes each and were fought under Full-Contact rules.

As there were too few men for a sixteen-man tournament, four of the contestants received byes through to the quarter final stage.  The tournament champion was Alexey Tokarev from Russia who won gold by defeating 2008 Olympic Games boxer Marko Tomasović from Croatia by unanimous decision in the final.   Defeated semi finalists Jukka Saarinen from Finland and Tihamér Brunner from Hungary received bronze medals.

Results

Key

See also
List of WAKO Amateur World Championships
List of WAKO Amateur European Championships
List of male kickboxers

References

External links
 WAKO World Association of Kickboxing Organizations Official Site

Kickboxing events at the WAKO World Championships 2007 Coimbra
2007 in kickboxing
Kickboxing in Portugal